Cotyclytus is a genus of beetles in the family Cerambycidae, containing the following species:

 Cotyclytus amazonicus (Fuchs, 1975)
 Cotyclytus basalis (Chevrolat, 1862)
 Cotyclytus cristatus (Chevrolat, 1862)
 Cotyclytus curvatus (Germar, 1821)
 Cotyclytus discretus (Melzer, 1934)
 Cotyclytus distinctus (Zajciw, 1963)
 Cotyclytus dorsalis (Laporte & Gory, 1835)
 Cotyclytus lebasii (Chevrolat, 1862)
 Cotyclytus magicus (Perty, 1832)
 Cotyclytus niger (Aurivillius, 1920)
 Cotyclytus patagonicus (Bruch, 1911)
 Cotyclytus peruvianus (Schmid, 2009)
 Cotyclytus potiuna (Galileo & Martins, 2007)
 Cotyclytus regularis (Chevrolat, 1862)
 Cotyclytus scenicus (Pascoe, 1866)
 Cotyclytus sobrinus (Laporte & Gory, 1835)
 Cotyclytus stillatus (Aurivillius, 1908)
 Cotyclytus suturalis (Fuchs, 1963)

References

 
Clytini